Sir Anthony Knyvett (circa 1507 – 1 March 1554) was an English courtier during the reign of King Henry VIII.

He was born in London, the son of Charles Knyvett, who was in the retinue of the Duke of Norfolk and John Bourchier, 2nd Baron Berners, the Deputy of Calais. He was described as a gentleman usher of the privy chamber to Henry VIII, with Roger Ratcliffe, in the Eltham Ordinance of 1526.

Knyvett was Lieutenant of the Tower of London and is mentioned in Foxe's Book of Martyrs for refusing to continue torturing the Protestant Anne Askew on the rack.  He was made Governor of Portsmouth in 1544 and oversaw the building of Southsea Castle in that year. It is thought that he may have been involved in the fraud created by Elizabeth Crofts.

In 1554, he joined Wyatt's Rebellion and was routed at the Battle of Hartley. He was executed at the Tower of London on 1 March 1554.

References 

1500s births
1554 deaths
16th-century English people
Executions at the Tower of London
Lieutenants of the Tower of London
Anthony
People executed under Mary I of England
Executed people from London
Knights Bachelor